José Villarreal may refer to:

José Carlos Villarreal, Mexican middle-distance runner, Pan Am Games champion
José Villarreal (athlete), paralympic athlete from Venezuela
Jose Villarreal (soccer), American soccer player
José Antonio Villarreal, novelist
Brigadier General Jose Augusto Villareal, 203 Infantry Brigade, Philippine Army
José Luis Villarreal, former Argentine footballer